Horeswood GAA is a Gaelic Athletic Association club in County Wexford, Ireland. The club fields teams in Gaelic football, hurling, camogie and Ladies Gaelic football, and participates in competitions organized by Wexford GAA county board.

Early history
William K. Redmond's Football Club became the first club from the parish to affiliate to the Wexford GAA in 1889, when Martin Kenny paid 10 shillings to County Treasurer, John J. Kehoe. The following year, the name of the club was changed to Campile Football Club. At the time, the Senior Championship was the only competition the club could enter and Campile Football Club were drawn against Vinegar Hill in the 1st round. The game ended prematurely; Campile claimed a disputed goal and when the referee decided in Campile's favour Vinegar Hill would not accept the decision and refused to continue. The game was awarded to Campile, but the team was beaten by Glynn in the next round.

Campile contested three County Junior Football Finals without success in 1909, 1910 and 1912. Two Campile players, brothers Martin and Jack Howlett, Dunbrody, played on the record-breaking Wexford football team of the 1910s. Martin won four All-Ireland Senior Medals from 1915 to 1918 and Jack won medals in 1916 and 1917.

1920-1966
During the 1920s, hurling enjoyed predominance around the Whitechurch area. Three county Junior Hurling Finals were contested by sides from the parish, in 1928 by Shelburne, 1938 by Campile and 1940 by Sean Finns, but all three ended in defeat. The association won its first county title in 1944 when Horeswood United won the Minor title.

This was followed by a Junior title in 1947 and a place in the senior ranks. Horeswood contested three Senior Finals, losing to Cloughbawn after a replay in 1952, and falling to St. Aidan's in 1952 and 1954. During this time, Paddy Shannon, John Cummins, John Hearn, Martin Byrne, Dominic Hearn and Mick O'Hanlon all represented the county at senior level. Hearn and O'Hanlon won All-Ireland Medals; Dominic Hearn in 1955 and Mick O'Hanlon (who also represented the county at Senior Football level) in 1955 and 1956. Hurling was how the association's dominant sport, though a County Junior Football Title was won in 1951 and the club spent five years in the Senior grade without any success.

Following the retirement of many key players, the club returned to the Intermediate hurling grade in 1956. They reached the Final in 1959 but lost to Oylegate. They returned to the senior ranks in 1961, when 41-year-old Mick O'Hanlon lined out at full back on a team that defeated Oylegate. A fourth Senior Final was contested in 1963 but they lost to an Oylegate side strengthened by a number of players from Ballyhogue.

In 1966 a Special Junior title was won, the last adult county hurling title won by the parish (a Junior B District title was won in 1999). Although they returned to the Intermediate Grade in 1971, and the club contested county finals in 1982 and 1986, they did not return to the Senior Ranks, and dropped a step further in 2002 when re-graded to Junior.

1969-1980
The club joined ranks with neighbouring St. James in the 1960s. Three football titles followed: the Under-16 and Minor double in 1969 and another Under-16 title in 1977. An Under-16 hurling title was also won in 1967 when additional players from Fethard and Cushinstown strengthened the team. The club reached the County Junior Final in 1972 but lost to Buffers Alley. Two Intermediate Finals were later contested; in 1977, losing to Starlights and in 1980, this time losing to a young Duffry Rovers side which went on to dominate the Senior grade for many years.

1986-present
In 1986 the club was re-graded back to the Junior ranks. Two years later the club won the Junior Championship, its first title for 37 years, since 1951. There followed a period of dominance of underage football in the county in the 1980s until the mid-1990s, winning Minor titles in 1989, 1993, 1995 and 1996 as well as Under 21 titles in 1991, 1994 and 1995, all in the Premier Grade, though success was slow to convert to adult level.

The club suffered another final defeat in 1994, losing the Intermediate Final to St. Martins. In 1998 the club returned to Senior Football, beating St. James in the Final in O'Kennedy Park, New Ross. They reached the first ever Wexford Senior Football Championship Final in 2003, losing to Kilanerin–Ballyfad.

In 2005, following a defeat against local rivals Gusserane, the senior team continued in the championship via the losers' route, beating Glynn/Barntown by a goal (1-08 - 0-08). The next qualifying round was against Kilanerin–Ballyfad (Mattie Forde held scoreless by captain, Darren O'Reilly). Again, the winning margin was three points; 0-12 to 0-09. In the quarter-final, a commanding first-half performance enabled Horeswood to progress on a score line of 3-07 to 0-09. 

In the semi-final against Castletown Liam Mellows, a goal separated the sides, with a final scoreline of 1-11 to 0-11.

Horeswood won in the final at Wexford Park against trainer and selector Aidan O'Brien's home club, Adamstown, led by Man of the Match, Ciaran Deely to win the County Championship. Although goalkeeper Diarmuid Hartley and his defence conceded their first goal of the tournament, Horeswood won with a scoreline of 0-14 to Adamstown's 1-08.

Notable players
 Tadhg Furlong, later a professional rugby union player

Honours
  Leinster Junior Club Hurling Championship winners 2022
 Wexford Senior Football Championship winners 2005, 2006, 2009, 2011
 Wexford Intermediate Football Championship winners 1998, 2018
 Wexford Intermediate Hurling Championship winners 1961
 Wexford Intermediate A Hurling Championship winners 2022
 Wexford Junior Football Championships winners 1988
 Wexford Junior Hurling Championships winners 1947, 2011, 2021
 Wexford Under-20 Football Rionn B Championship winner
 Wexford Under-21 Football Championships winners 1991, 1994, 1995
 Wexford Minor Football Championships winners 1989, 1993, 1995, 1996
 Wexford Football League Division 2 winners 2022
 Wexford Football League Division 6 winners 2018, 2019

References

External links
 Official Horeswood GAA Club website

Gaelic football clubs in County Wexford
Gaelic games clubs in County Wexford
Hurling clubs in County Wexford